The 1910–11 Harvard Crimson men's ice hockey season was the 14th season of play for the program.

Season
Prior to the season Harvard was able to reach a deal with the recently constructed Boston Arena to use the facility for both practice and games. This was the first year where the Crimson would have both indoor and/or artificial ice available which would negate the cancelling of games due to poor weather conditions. Harvard would play nine of their ten games at the Boston Arena and performed about as well as they had at the Harvard Stadium Rink the year before.

With the arena available to them Harvard scheduled five games early in the season against non-conference opponents and gave a strong showing. The Crimson won four of the matches and entered the conference season looking for revenge against Princeton. After dispatching Columbia Harvard welcomed the Tigers to the new home with a convincing win. Their next match turned out to be the game of the season when undefeated Cornell came to town. The two scarlet clubs battled to a 2–2 draw after regulation and, with the IHA crown in the balance, Cornell's Jefferson Vincent scored the game-winner.

Though their hopes for a championship had been dashed, the Crimson ended the season with two more victories for a 8–2 record and a second consecutive runner-up finish in the IHA.

Roster

Standings

Schedule and Results

|-
!colspan=12 style=";" | Regular Season

References

Harvard Crimson men's ice hockey seasons
Harvard
Harvard
Harvard
Harvard
Harvard